Orthogonius cruralis is a species of ground beetle in the subfamily Orthogoniinae. It was described by Putzeys in Chaudoir in 1871.

References

cruralis
Beetles described in 1871